Voivodeship Road 106 (abbreviated DW 106) is a route in the Polish voivodeship roads network. The road is 108 km in length and runs through 4 powiats: Kamień County (Gmina Kamień Pomorski and Gmina Golczewo), Goleniów County (Gmina Nowogard and Gmina Maszewo), Stargard County (Gmina Stargard Szczeciński and the city Stargard Szczeciński) and Pyrzyce County (Gmina Warnice and Gmina Pyrzyce).

Important settlements along the route

Rzewnowo
Golczewo
Nowogard
Jenikowo
Maszewo
Łęczyca
Stargard Szczeciński
Warnice
Pyrzyce

References

106